Barbara Dixon or Dickson may refer to:

 Barbara Dixon, former president of Truman State University
 Barbara Dickson, Scottish actress and singer
 Barbara Dixon, a fictional character in the British comedy series The League of Gentlemen